Laika & the Cosmonauts were a Finnish rock band. They had the same lineup from the time they formed in 1987 until they stopped recording in 2008. The band was named after Laika, a Soviet space dog that died on board Sputnik 2 in 1957.
Their sound was usually described as surf rock, but a Boston Globe review noted that the band's sound is "far beyond the limitations of any specific genre." The band relied heavily on the Finnish rautalanka electric guitar tradition. They toured the United States and Europe several times. Al Jourgensen of Ministry called them "the best f**king band in the world".
In an email to the band's mailing list on 23 April 2008, Laika & the Cosmonauts announced they would be drawing their twenty-year career to a close with an American tour through the summer of 2008. The tour ended with shows at the Continental Club in Austin, Texas that fall. A compilation album, Cosmopolis, was released at the start of the tour.

Band members
 Mikko Lankinen – guitar
 Matti Pitsinki – organ, guitar
 Tom Nyman – bass
 Janne Haavisto – drums

Discography
 C'mon Do the Laika (1988)
 Surfs You Right (1990)
 Instruments of Terror (1992)
 The Amazing Colossal Band (1995)
 Zero Gravity – US compilation (1996)
 Absurdistan (1997)
 Laika Sex Machine – Live (2000)
 Local Warming (2004)
 Cosmopolis   – Compilation (2008)

References

External links
 2004 NPR interview
 Laika & the Cosmonauts Allmusic

Finnish musical groups
Instrumental musical groups
Surf music groups
Musical groups established in 1987
Musical groups disestablished in 2008
Yep Roc Records artists